A Master of Professional Writing Program is a type of graduate degree program in professional writing. Chatham University in Pennsylvania has an online MPW program. The University of Southern California's MPW program ended in May 2016, at which point it moved to the Vermont College of Fine Arts under the new name the School of Writing and Publishing.

Notable alumni of the USC program
Millicent Borges Accardi, poet and recipient of a National Endowment for the Arts fellowship
Mark Andrus, author of As Good as It Gets and Life as a House
Margaret Davis, author of biographies of William Mulholland and Edward L. Doheny
Frederick Johnson,  Emmy- and  WGA Award-winning writer of  daytime television serials
Charlotte Laws, author and animal rights advocate
EM Lewis, playwright
Sandra Tsing Loh, radio commentator and author
Gina Nahai, author of Cry of the Peacock
Greg Rucka, writer of novels and comic books
Ann Seaman, author of biographies of Jimmy Swaggart and Madalyn Murray O'Hair
Lee Wochner, playwright

Notable faculty of the USC program

Shelley Berman, humor writing
Nan Cohen, poetry
Syd Field, screenwriting
Janet Fitch, fiction
Noel Riley Fitch, non-fiction
Donald Freed, playwriting
Amy Gerstler, poetry
Dana Goodyear, non-fiction
Janet Irvin, fiction
Irvin Kershner, cinema/TV
Jerome Lawrence, playwriting
Dinah Lenney, non-fiction
Gerald Locklin, poetry, fiction
Larry the Cable Guy, cinema/TV
MG Lord, non-fiction
Shelly Lowenkopf, fiction, publishing
David Scott Milton, playwriting
Gina Nahai, fiction
Gabrielle Pina, fiction
Robert Pirosh, cinema/TV
Beata Pozniak, drama/film/TV
James Ragan, poetry and program director for 25 years
John Rechy, fiction
Aram Saroyan, poetry, fiction
Hubert Selby Jr., fiction
Melville Shavelson, cinema/TV
Gay Talese, non-fiction
Shirley Thomas, technical writing
Kenneth Turan, film
Lee Wochner, playwriting
Richard Yates, fiction

References

External links
Chatham University program
Vermont College of Fine Arts program

Writing
Fine Arts